The Créteil International Women's Film Festival (in French Festival international de films de femmes de Créteil) is an annual event in Créteil, France, founded by Jackie Buet in 1978 to showcase the directing talents of female filmmakers who, at the time, had difficulty getting their films adequately distributed. The first festival was held in 1979 in Sceaux. It transferred to Créteil in 1985.

Located in Créteil, a city southeast of Paris, today the festival is 10 non-stop days premiering 50 or more new films directed by one or more women. The festival also offers film classes, thematic forums and debates. The competition is open to women from around the world who have made a feature-length documentary, a short length fiction and a documentary film. Their work is judged by a jury of 6 cinema professionals.

The festival offers a number of prizes including several Audience awards and the "Grand Jury Prize." There is a festival archive containing more than 10,000 films by women.

In 2005, recent directors featured include works from Hong Kong, Butterfly by MAK Yan Yan, Ho Yuk by YAU Ching and Lim Poh Huat by Lee Wong from Singapore.

Winners of the Grand Prix

See also
 List of women's film festivals
 Women's cinema
 Woman's film
 Women in film
 Feminist film theory
 List of female film and television directors
 List of female film directors
 Black women filmmakers

References

External links
 Official site
 Créteil International Women's Film Festival at the Internet Movie Database
  ("Films de Femmes@fiffemmes")

Adapted from the article Créteil International Women's Film Festival, from Wikinfo, licensed under the GNU Free Documentation License.

Film festivals in France
Women's film festivals
Recurring events established in 1978
Women in France
1978 establishments in France